Linda is an extinct town in New Madrid County, in the U.S. state of Missouri. The GNIS classifies it as a populated place.

A post office called Linda was established in 1901, and remained in operation until 1922. The community was named after Linda Stewart, an early settler.

References

Ghost towns in Missouri
Former populated places in New Madrid County, Missouri